Giannis Chondrogiannis or Hondrogiannis (1761–1835) was a Greek politician and a revolutionary leader.  He worked with Asimakis Zaimis.

Biography
On 15 March 1821, an ignorance of the leader of the revolution in which he had defined his start on 25 March, Chondrogiannis asked his money from Zaimis and together with his six children along with Petioti which let him ambushed in Chelonospila at the Turkish agent. Together with the agent were also Tambakopoulos and Konstantinoupolitis, in which wend luckily to Tripolitsa. Tambakopoulos had money and bonded together with him and took that and later abandonedly fled and left. His money were provenly given in the revolution.

In that, the power of Chondrogiannis and his children were reasoned in which all of them waited. In the same the, who was watched by the Turks, the Greeks began their rules on the revolutionary works earlier and which had programmedly urged from a lucky note.

After the Revolution, the Tambakopoulos (which he died) made lawsuit in Chondrogiannis and asked for compensation on the bonding and the money.  The court which judged and almost the money which he spend on the leaders of the revolution was also managed them, he sold his entire estate.  Later, he was sentenced under robbery and was imprisoned in the same time the judge knew his offer during the revolution.

His children were sentenced and left and went in violation of laws in order to live. Petioti which he did not functioned which he made his lawsuit that he was participated.

References
Istoria tis Ellinikis Epanastasis (Ιστορία της Ελληνικής Επανάστασης = History of the Greek Revolution), Spyridon Trikoupis, Nea Synora, A. A. Livani, Athens 1993 SET 
Peloponisii agonistes tou 1821, Nikitara apomnimonevmata (Πελοποννήσιοι αγωνιστές του 1821, Νικηταρά απομνημονεύματα = Peloponnesian Revolutionary Leaders in 1821, Nikitaras Remembered), Fotakos, Vergina publishers, Athens 1996
Fotakou apomnimonevmata (Φωτάκου απομνημονεύματα = Fotakou Remembered), Vergina, 1996
This article is translated and is based from the article at the Greek Wikipedia (el:Main Page)

1761 births
1835 deaths
People from Kleitoria
Greek people of the Greek War of Independence